Ronald Levy (born 30 October 1992) is a Jamaican male track and field athlete who competes in the 110 metres hurdles. He holds a personal best of 13.05 seconds for that event, set in 2017, as well as a 100 metres sprint best of 10.17 seconds. He was the gold medallist at the 2018 Commonwealth Games and represented his country at the World Championships in Athletics in 2017.

Born in Westmoreland Parish, he went on to study at the University of Technology, Jamaica. He took time to develop as an elite athlete, initially competing in a variety of sprint and hurdles events. In the 2014 season, he ran a best of 20.81 seconds for the 200 metres, showing his flat speed. He gradually improved his time in the 110 m hurdles, running 13.63 seconds in 2015 and 13.50 in 2016.

A significant breakthrough came in the 2017 season under the coaching of Stephen Francis and Brigitte Foster-Hylton. He defeated Olympic medallist Hansle Parchment at the UTech Classic before winning at the Penn Relays in a new best of 13.33 seconds. On his IAAF Diamond League debut he was runner-up to Olympic champion Omar McLeod at the Prefontaine Classic – his time of 13.10 seconds ranked him second in the world behind his compatriot. He was runner-up to McLeod at the Jamaican Athletics Championships in June, then overhauled his rival to win at the Meeting de Paris Diamond League, establishing himself among the world's best with a time of 13.05 seconds. Another win followed at the Meeting Città di Padova, but at the 2017 World Championships in Athletics he failed at the first hurdle in the heats and withdrew.

He had his first indoor hurdles appearances in 2018 and, after a win at the Glasgow Indoor Grand Prix, he managed to reach the 60 metres hurdles semi-finals at the 2018 IAAF World Indoor Championships, narrowly missing out on qualification for the final by one hundredth of a second. He achieved his first international medal at the age of 25, taking gold at the Commonwealth Games in a Jamaican 1–2 with Hansle Parchment.

In June 2020, Levy won the Jamaican Olympic trials with a time of 13.10 to qualify for the 2020 Summer Olympics. In the final of the 110 m hurdles at the Olympic Games he won the bronze medal with a time of 13.10, finishing behind Hansle Parchment and Grant Holloway.

Personal bests
60 metres – 6.62 (2016)
100 metres – 10.17 (2017)
200 metres – 20.81 (2014)
60 metres hurdles – 7.49 (2017)
110 metres hurdles – 13.05 (2017)

International competitions

1Disqualified in the semifinals

References

External links

1992 births
Living people
People from Westmoreland Parish
Jamaican male hurdlers
Jamaican male sprinters
Commonwealth Games gold medallists for Jamaica
Commonwealth Games medallists in athletics
Athletes (track and field) at the 2018 Commonwealth Games
World Athletics Championships athletes for Jamaica
Jamaican Athletics Championships winners
Commonwealth Games gold medallists in athletics
Athletes (track and field) at the 2020 Summer Olympics
Medalists at the 2020 Summer Olympics
Olympic bronze medalists for Jamaica
Olympic bronze medalists in athletics (track and field)
Olympic athletes of Jamaica
Medallists at the 2018 Commonwealth Games